Caleb Robert Clarke (born June 23, 1993) is a Canadian soccer player.

Early career
Clarke began playing youth soccer with the Richmond Selects. He later played with Coastal WFC, with whom he won a USL Super Y-League North American championship title, before joining the Whitecaps FC Academy in 2009. In 2008 and 2009, he trained with Italian club Udinese.

Playing career

Vancouver Whitecaps
From 2010 to 2012, he played with the Vancouver Whitecaps FC U-23 in the Premier Development League. After impressing with the PDL side, he began appearing with the Vancouver Whitecaps Reserve side in the MLS Reserve League in 2011, while also training with the first team.

In April 2012, he signed a Major League Soccer contract with Vancouver Whitecaps FC as a homegrown player, becoming the first Vancouver-area player to graduate from the academy to the first team. In June 2012, he went on trial with German 3. Liga club FC Rot-Weiß Erfurt, with the possibility of securing a one-year loan. He made his MLS debut on August 15, 2012 as a substitute against FC Dallas. In his first season, he made two substitute appearances with the Whitecaps for a total of 15 minutes of action.

In May 2013, he went on trial with Dutch club Feyenoord. In July 2013, he went on loan with German side FC Augsburg II in the fourth tier Regionalliga Bayern, while also training with the first team. In 26 appearances, he scored 8 goals, before returning to Canada in May to undergo surgery to repair a ruptured quadriceps muscle at the end of May the following year.

In December 2014, he re-signed with the Whitecaps. He spent the majority of the 2015 season playing for the new second team Whitecaps FC 2 in the USL. He scored the first goal in the second team's history on April 1, 2015. After the 2015 season he departed the Whitecaps.

Germany
On February 1, 2016, he returned to Germany, joining fourth tier side SpVgg Unterhaching.

Later in 2016, he joined another German side FC Amberg in the fifth tier Bayernliga Nord, also playing for their second team. Following Amberg's relegation, he was released by the club.

University career
In 2018, he began attending the University of British Columbia, playing for the men's soccer team. He scored his first goal in his debut on August 31 against the UFV Cascades. On September 16, he scored a hat trick against the Calgary Dinos, which earned him U Sports Athlete of the Week honours. He was named a Canada West Second Team All-Star.

Amateur and semi-pro
After returning from Germany, he also played at the amateur level in the Vancouver Metro Soccer League with amateur clubs such as CCB United between 2018 and 2022.

In July 2019, he signed with the Victoria Highlanders FC in USL League Two.

In May 2022, he joined Varsity FC in the new League1 British Columbia.

International career
In 2011, he received his first call up to the Canadian national team program, attending a camp for the Canada U18 team. He was a part of the Canada U20 team for the 2013 CONCACAF U-20 Championship, where he scored two goals in a 5-1 victory over Nicaragua U20 on February 22.

On November 12, 2013 earned his first call-up for the Canadian national men's soccer team as a replacement for Iain Hume ahead of friendlies against Czech Republic and Slovenia. Clarke made his senior debut on November 15 against in a 2-0 away defeat to Czech Republic as a second half sub for Dwayne De Rosario.

In July 2015, he was named to the Canada U23 team for the 2015 Pan Am Games. In May 2016, Clarke was called to U23 national team for a pair of friendlies against Guyana and Grenada. He scored in both matches.

References

External links
 Caleb Clarke Whitecaps FC profile
 Caleb Clarke FuPa profile
 Caleb Clarke Stats
 

1993 births
Living people
Canadian soccer players
Canadian expatriate soccer players
Vancouver Whitecaps Residency players
Vancouver Whitecaps FC U-23 players
Vancouver Whitecaps FC players
Whitecaps FC 2 players
Association football forwards
Expatriate footballers in Germany
USL League Two players
Major League Soccer players
People from Richmond, British Columbia
Soccer people from British Columbia
Canada men's youth international soccer players
Canada men's under-23 international soccer players
Canada men's international soccer players
Footballers at the 2015 Pan American Games
Canadian people of English descent
Canadian sportspeople of Jamaican descent
FC Amberg players
UBC Thunderbirds soccer players
Homegrown Players (MLS)
Pan American Games competitors for Canada
Victoria Highlanders players
SpVgg Unterhaching players
Regionalliga players
Bayernliga players
USL Championship players
League1 British Columbia players
Nautsa’mawt FC players